44th Emmy Awards may refer to:

 44th Primetime Emmy Awards, held in 1992
 44th Daytime Emmy Awards, held in 2017
 44th International Emmy Awards, held in 2016